General elections were held in Niue for the first time on 23 March 1960.  A total of 39 candidates contested the 14 seats in the Assembly, with 2,118 voters registered. Voter turnout was 97%.

Background
As part of the 1915 Cook Islands Act, Niue was granted a 12-member Island Council with a representative appointed from each village by the Governor-General of New Zealand from candidates nominated by the Minister for the Cook Islands. The members were de facto chosen by the fono of each village, which was attended by the heads of each family.

The Cook Islands Act 1957 resulted in the legislature being renamed the Niue Island Assembly, as well as increasing its membership to 14 elected members and the Resident Commissioner as president, and providing for election by secret ballot for all Niueans aged 18 or over.

Results

References

Niue
1960 in Niue
Elections in Niue
March 1960 events in Oceania